Normand Chaurette  (July 9, 1954 – August 31, 2022) was a Canadian playwright, best known as one of the first prominent writers of LGBT-themed plays in Quebec and Canada.

Life and career
Chaurette's career began in 1976 with Rêve d'une nuit d'hôpital, a radio play broadcast by Radio-Canada and inspired by the life of Émile Nelligan. The play won the international Prix Paul-Gilson for francophone radio drama, and was later presented in a stage format in 1980. His second play, Provincetown Playhouse, juillet 1919, j'avais 19 ans, was staged in 1981.

His 1991 play Les reines became the first theatre piece by a Quebec writer to be staged at the Comédie-Française.

He was a three-time winner of the Governor General's Award for French-language drama, for Le Passage de l'Indiana in 1996, Le Petit Köchel in 2001 and Ce qui meurt en dernier in 2011, and was nominated for Fragments d'une lettre d'adieu lus par des géologues in 1986.

He also published a novel, Scènes d'enfants, which was nominated for the Governor General's Award for French-language fiction in 1988, and a non-fiction book, Comment tuer Shakespeare, which won the Governor General's Award for French-language non-fiction in 2012. He won a Floyd S. Chalmers Canadian Play Award in 1993 for Les reines.

He also translated a number of plays into French, including Friedrich Schiller's Mary Stuart, Henrik Ibsen's Hedda Gabler and works by Shakespeare. As well, his translation of Romeo and Juliet was directed by Yves Desgagné as the 2006 film Roméo et Juliette,

He was named an Officer of the Order of Canada in 2004.

Works

Plays
 Rêve d'une nuit d'hôpital (1976)
 Provincetown Playhouse, juillet 1919, j'avais 19 ans (1981)
 Les Trois Grâces (1982)
 La Société de Métis (1983)
 Fragments d'une lettre d'adieu lus par les géologues (1986)
 Les Reines (1991)
 Le Passage de l'Indiana (1996)
 Je vous écris du Caire (1996)
 Brève d'ailleurs (1997)
 Stabat Mater I (1997)
 Le Pont du Gard vu de nuit (1998)
 Stabat Mater II (1999)
 Petit navire (1999)
 Le Petit Köchel (2000)
 Ce qui meurt en dernier (2011)

Novel
 Scènes d'enfants (1988)

Non-fiction
 Comment tuer Shakespeare (2011)

References

External links

 Archives of Normand Chaurette (Fonds Normand Chaurette, R13018) is held at Library and Archives Canada

1954 births
2022 deaths
20th-century Canadian dramatists and playwrights
Canadian male novelists
Canadian non-fiction writers in French
Canadian screenwriters in French
20th-century Canadian novelists
21st-century Canadian dramatists and playwrights
Writers from Montreal
French Quebecers
Canadian LGBT dramatists and playwrights
Canadian LGBT screenwriters
Officers of the Order of Canada
Université de Montréal alumni
Canadian gay writers
Canadian LGBT novelists
Governor General's Award-winning dramatists
Governor General's Award-winning non-fiction writers
Canadian novelists in French
Canadian dramatists and playwrights in French
20th-century Canadian translators
21st-century Canadian translators
Canadian male screenwriters
Canadian male dramatists and playwrights
20th-century Canadian male writers
21st-century Canadian male writers
20th-century Canadian screenwriters
21st-century Canadian screenwriters
Canadian male non-fiction writers
21st-century Canadian non-fiction writers
Gay screenwriters
Gay dramatists and playwrights
Gay novelists
21st-century Canadian LGBT people
20th-century Canadian LGBT people